The 1994 season was the third full year of competitive football in the Baltic country as an independent nation. After having failed to qualify for the 1994 FIFA World Cup the Estonia national football team for the first time in history competed at the qualifying tournament for the European Championship. Manager Uno Piir was replaced by Roman Ubakivi after the 4-0 loss against the United States on 7 May 1994. In twelve games Estonia only managed to get one draw.

Cyprus vs Estonia

United States vs Estonia

Estonia vs Wales

Republic of Macedonia vs Estonia

Lithuania vs Estonia

Estonia vs Latvia

Iceland vs Estonia

Estonia vs Croatia

Estonia vs Italy

Estonia vs Finland

Latvia vs Estonia

Ukraine vs Estonia

Notes

References
 RSSSF detailed results
 RSSSF detailed results
 RSSSF detailed results
 RSSSF detailed results

1994
1994 national football team results
National